Chad Samuel Tracy (born July 4, 1985) is an American professional baseball manager and former player. He is currently the manager of the Worcester Red Sox. He played college baseball at Pepperdine University then played professionally from 2006 to 2014, primarily as a first baseman. He also competed for the United States national baseball team.

Playing career

High school and college
Tracy attended Claremont High School in Claremont, California, then Pepperdine University, where he played college baseball for the Pepperdine Waves baseball team in the West Coast Conference (WCC) of the NCAA Division I. At Pepperdine, Tracy was named the WCC All-Star catcher and Player of the Year in 2005, as he led the WCC with a .367 batting average, 94 hits, 12 home runs, 61 runs batted in (RBIs), and 22 doubles. He was named a preseason All-American and a semifinalist for the Johnny Bench Award, given to the top catcher in NCAA Division I, in 2006.

Minor League Baseball
Tracy was drafted by the Texas Rangers in the third round (88th overall) of the 2006 Major League Baseball draft. He made his professional debut with the Spokane Indians of the Class-A Short Season Northwest League that season, and was named a Northwest League postseason all-star.

In 2007, Tracy played for the Clinton LumberKings of the Class A Midwest League, batting .250 with 14 home runs and 84 RBIs in 134 games; defensively, he was primarily a left fielder. He was named a mid-season all-star. He also played 26 games in the Hawaii Winter Baseball league. In 2008, he played for the Bakersfield Blaze of the Class A-Advanced California League and the Frisco RoughRiders of the Double-A Texas League, batting a combined .296 with 17 home runs and 82 RBIs in 130 games, while seeing time as a left fielder, first baseman, and catcher. He also played 15 games in the Arizona Fall League.

Tracy returned to Double-A Frisco in 2009, playing 136 games while batting .279 with 26 home runs and 107 RBIs; defensively, he played 81 games as a first baseman. He was also named a Texas League postseason all-star. In 2010, Tracy played in Triple-A with the Oklahoma City RedHawks, batting .263 with 17 home runs and 55 RBIs in 78 games. He also played one game with the rookie-league Arizona League Rangers.

The Rangers invited Tracy to spring training as a non-roster invitee in 2011. He spent the season in Triple-A, batting .259 with 26 home runs and 109 RBIs in 134 games for the Round Rock Express of the Pacific Coast League (PCL).

The Colorado Rockies acquired Tracy from the Rangers before the 2012 season, via a trade for pitcher Greg Reynolds, and invited him to spring training. He spent the season with the Colorado Springs Sky Sox of the PCL, playing in 133 games while batting .259 with 12 home runs and 82 RBIs. After the season, Tracy elected to become a free agent.

Tracy signed a minor-league contract with the Kansas City Royals prior to the 2013 season. In 45 games with the Omaha Royals of the PCL, he batted .187 with 4 home runs and 18 RBIs. He was released on July 3. He then played 59 games with the York Revolution of the Atlantic League of Professional Baseball, an independent baseball league, batting .289 with 9 home runs and 37 RBIs. In January 2014, Tracy signed a minor-league contract with the Baltimore Orioles, but did play for their organization. He returned to the Revolution, batting .272 with 23 home runs and 97 RBIs during t2014, his final professional season as a player.

Overall, Tracy played eight seasons with affiliated Minor League Baseball teams, appearing in 857 games while batting .265 with 127 home runs and 572 RBIs. He also played 233 games with other professional teams (fall, winter, or independent leagues), batting .264 with 42 home runs and 161 RBIs. Defensively, he played primarily as a first baseman, appearing at that position in 499 total games while compiling a .986 fielding percentage.

International competition
Tracy played for the United States national baseball team in the 2011 Baseball World Cup and the 2011 Pan American Games, winning the silver medal.

Managerial career
Tracy managed for three seasons in the farm system of the Los Angeles Angels. In 2015, he led the Burlington Bees of the Class A Midwest League to a 63–76 record. He then spent 2016 and 2017 with the Inland Empire 66ers, a Class A-Advanced team in the California League, compiling records of 48–92 and 65–75, respectively. He then spent four seasons as the Angels' minor league field coordinator.

On December 13, 2021, Davis was named the manager of the Worcester Red Sox, the Triple-A affiliate of the Boston Red Sox.

Managerial record

Personal
Tracy's father, Jim Tracy, is a former Major League Baseball player, coach, and manager in the National League. His paternal grandfather, Jim Tracy Sr., and two brothers, Brian and Mark, also played baseball professionally.

References

External links

1985 births
Living people
Arizona League Rangers players
Bakersfield Blaze players
Baseball first basemen
Baseball players at the 2011 Pan American Games
Baseball players from Illinois
Clinton LumberKings players
Colorado Springs Sky Sox players
Frisco RoughRiders players
Medalists at the 2011 Pan American Games
Minor league baseball managers
Oklahoma City RedHawks players
Omaha Storm Chasers players
Pan American Games medalists in baseball
Pan American Games silver medalists for the United States
Pepperdine Waves baseball players
People from Arlington Heights, Illinois
Round Rock Express players
Spokane Indians players
Sportspeople from Cook County, Illinois
Surprise Rafters players
United States national baseball team players
Worcester Red Sox managers
York Revolution players